Bo Christensen (24 August 1937 – 11 April 2020) was a Danish film producer.

Christensen is best known for producing Babette's Feast (1987), for which he won the Best Foreign Film Oscar and the BAFTA Best Foreign Film award in 1988.

He acted in five films, and produced or co-produced some 60 movies over the years and continued to be busy as a producer. He has produced most of the Olsen-banden movies and is the producer of Denmark most successful TV series Matador (1978–1982).

Selected filmography
 2003 - Regel nr. 1
 1999 - Den eneste ene
 1992 - Sofie
 1991 - Europa
 1989 - Miraklet i Valby
 1988 - Katinka
 1987 - Babette’s Feast
 1976 - The Olsen Gang Sees Red
 1969 - We Are All Demons
 1967 - Story of Barbara
 1966 - Relax Freddie
 1966 - Gift
 1964 - Døden kommer til middag
 1964 - Summer in Tyrol

References

External links

Danish Film Institute profile

Danish film producers
1937 births
2020 deaths
Filmmakers who won the Best Foreign Language Film BAFTA Award
Producers who won the Best Film Guldbagge Award